Corridor 8 is the TransJakarta bus rapid transit corridor operated with the route from the Lebak Bulus bus terminal to Harmoni Central BRT Station. Corridor 8 traverses along Jalan Pasar Jumat, Jalan Ciputat Raya, Jalan TB Simatupang, Jalan Metro Pondok Indah, Jalan Arterial Pondok Indah, Jalan Teuku Nyak Arif, Jalan Letjen Supeno, Jalan Panjang, Jalan Daan Mogot, Jalan Letjen S. Parman, Jalan Kyai Tapa, Jalan KH Hasyim Ashyari and Jalan Gajah Mada / Hayam Wuruk.  Kebayoran Lama is integrated with KRL Commuterline in Kebayoran railway station which serves the route Tanah Abang -  Serpong /  Parung Panjang /  Maja /  Rangkasbitung and Indosiar Stop integrated with KRL Commuterline Tangerang Line at Pesing railway station which serves the route Duri - Tangerang. The Lebak Bulus BRT Station is the only Transjakarta bus stop that is integrated with the Jakarta MRT since the inauguration of the MRT line on March 2019.

Corridor 8 was inaugurated on February 21, 2009 by the Governor of Jakarta at the time, Fauzi Bowo.

On March 2022, the construction of a pedestrian skywalk in Kebayoran Lama, South Jakarta was carried out to create a transit point that connects Corridor 8 at the Pasar Kebayoran Lama BRT Station, Corridor 13 at the Velbak BRT Station, and with the Kebayoran railway station which serves the Rangkasbitung Line of the KRL Commuterline. As a follow-up to the construction of the skywalk, the Pasar Kebayoran Lama BRT Station was closed on September 5, 2022 for renovation and Transjakarta users were diverted to use the Kebayoran Lama Bungur and the Simprug BRT Station during the closure. The construction of the Kebayoran Lama skywalk underwent a public trial on 21-24 January 2023, and was inaugurated by the Acting Governor of Jakarta, Heru Budi Hartono on Friday, 27 January 2023, even though the Pasar Kebayoran Lama BRT Station was still closed for renovation until it was reopened on February 6, 2023.

Starting March 4, 2023, as the impact of the Jakarta MRT phase 2A construction, TransJakarta extends the route temporarily to the Pasar Baru BRT Station, due to the Harmoni Central Busway BRT station moved its operational into a temporary buliding that can only serves corridor 1 passegers. At the same time corridor 8A merged with the main corridor, so the bus of the main corridor do not stop at the Grogol 1 and Sumber Waras BRT stations.

List of BRT Stations
 As the impact of the Jakarta MRT construction, TransJakarta temporarily extends the route to the Pasar Baru BRT station by merging  corridor 8A with the main corridor, starting from March 4, 2023 until the MRT construction completed in 2027 or 2029.
 Station indicated by a -> sign has a one way service towards Pasar Baru only.
 Currently, all bus stops are served by buses 24 hours a day.
 Italic text indicates that the BRT station is temporarily closed for renovation or the bus do not stop at the station.

Fleets 
 Scania K320IA CNG Euro IV, white-light blue (MB)
 Zhongtong Bus LCK6180GC Euro 5, white-dark blue (PPD)
 Mercedes-Benz OH 1626 NG OM906LA A/T, white-dark blue (MYS)
 Mercedes-Benz OH 1626 NG OM906LA A/T, white-dark blue and Jak Lingko card Livery (BMP)
 Hino RK8 R260, blue (PPD)
 Hino RK8 R260, blue (BMP, night bus (22:00 - 05:00) (Lebak Bulus-Harmoni (via S. Parman, Tomang Raya)))
 Volvo B11R 6×2 A/T, white-blue (SAF)

Depots 
 Ciputat (PPD)
 Ciputat (BMP)
 Klender (PPD)
 Klender (MB)
 Cijantung (MYS)
 Pegangsaan Dua (SAF)

See also

TransJakarta
List of TransJakarta corridors

References

External links 
 

Bus routes
TransJakarta